Gagra is a railway station in Gagra, Abkhazia. Belongs to Abkhazian Railways.

Main information
Gagra station is one of 3 railway stations of Gagra, the other 2 are Abaata and Gagrypsh.

History
The station was opened in 1943 and was called Gagra-Tovarnaya. In 1959 it was renamed in Gagra Railway station.

Trains
 Moscow–Sukhumi
 St.Petersburg–Sukhumi
 Belgorod–Sukhumi
 Adler–Gagra

References

External links
 Train times
 AbZD website

Railway stations in Abkhazia
Railway stations opened in 1943